Caragana pygmaea is a flowering plant species in the genus Caragana.

References

Hedysareae